This is a list of buildings designed by Talbot Hobbs in Western Australia between 1887 and 1938.

See also
List of heritage buildings in Perth, Western Australia
List of heritage places in Fremantle
List of heritage places in York, Western Australia

References 

Hobbs
Hobbs